The Trident Rugby Football Club is a Miami, Florida based men's rugby union team. Since its founding in 1972, Trident has been one of the preeminent Miami rugby club. Admitted in 1973, Trident competes within the Florida Rugby Union and currently fields a competitive top division team as well as a developmental team.

Following an undefeated 2015/16 regular season, winning by an average margin of 30 points per game (a Florida Rugby Record), the Tridents entered the Florida Rugby Playoffs as the top seed. A 72-10 semifinal win over Jacksonville secured the Tridents a berth in the State Finals against Naples RFC. On April 16, at the state rugby championship in Wellington, FL, the Tridents defeated Naples 28 to 0 to become the State of Florida Top Division Champions. Since then the Tridents have gone on to win consecutive back to back Championships in 2016, 2017, 2018, 2019 and 2021 in the Florida Premier Division.

History
The Trident Rugby Football Club was founded in 1972, by a group of players from the University of Miami Men's Rugby club. The UM rugby club, formed three years earlier, had grown too large, and the lack of playing time prompted these players to meet in 1972 to establish their own, independent club; Trident RFC.

The Tridents lost the contest 0 to 15. That same autumn, the Tridents played in their first divisional match, a winning effort against Naples RFC. Subsequently, the Tridents lost their second divisional fixture to UM RFC and ended their inaugural season 1-1.

On Wednesday, September 7, 2016, the Miami-Dade Mayor Carlos Gimenez alongside Commissioner Jose "Pepe" Diaz recognized the team following an undefeated season by proclaiming September 7 "Trident Rugby Football Club Day" in Miami-Dade County. A great honor that was followed by the first ever lineout performed inside City Hall.

Today, the Tridents continue to play rugby in Miami as a member of the Florida Rugby Union.

Tours 
Bahamas - 1978

Practices
During regular season, usually October through April, practices are held at Athalie Range Park in the City of Miami Tuesdays and Thursdays at 7:30PM – 9:30 PM.

Matches
Home matches are typically played on Saturdays at 2pm throughout autumn, winter, and spring. 
A current schedule of matches is published on the club's website.

Sponsors
The Tridents Sponsorship List

Social Sponsor - Gramps Wynwood
Social Sponsor - Heineken International

2020/21 1st XV squad

References

External links
 Trident Rugby Football Club
 Florida Rugby Union
 USA Rugby South Territorial Union
http://www.gramps.com

Rugby clubs established in 1973
American rugby union teams
Rugby union teams in Miami